Estrogen-related receptor beta (ERR-β), also known as ESRRB or NR3B2 (nuclear receptor subfamily 3, group B, member 2), is a nuclear receptor that in humans is encoded by the ESRRB (Estrogen Related Receptor Beta) gene .

Function 
ESRRB has been shown to be vital for the transition between a naïve pluripotent and primed pluripotent state in mammalian cells, and NANOG controls the expression of ESRRB in this scenario.

References

Further reading 

 
 
 
 
 
 
 
 
 
 
 
 
 

Intracellular receptors
Transcription factors